"Hold On" is a song by the band Triumph. It appeared on their album Just a Game (1979) and was also released as a single. The single was released on August 6, 1979 and rose to number 38 on the Billboard Hot 100. The song was written by Rik Emmett.

History

Rik Emmett said the song started as he was singing open vowels over some chord changes, and then he started saying the words "Hold on, hold on" out of holding the open vowel notes. "So now I was going to say, "Okay, so the song's going to be called 'Hold On.' What am I going to hold on for? Well, I'm going to hold on to my dreams." Then the lyrics grew backwards out of the hook," he said.

The song, like "Lay It on the Line" from the same album, was written two years before the release of the album. After failing to be noticed as an acoustic track in concert the band decided to make it a rock song and placed it at the end of the concept song, The Twisted Maze which compasses the entire second side of the vinyl.

The song was rarely performed by the entire band in concert, due to its broad and complex arrangements. The live version from Stages, which is the only official live version, was done acoustically.

The B-side is the title track for the album.

The single version of the song was cut up and altered to help its chart potential, where it became only a two-minute-and-fifty-nine-second track. The edit did not include the acoustic folk section of the beginning or the disco-styled breakdown at the end.

Track listing

 "Hold On" (Rik Emmett) – 2:59
 "Just a Game" (Rik Emmett) – 5:48

Personnel
Rik Emmett – guitar, lead vocals
Mike Levine – bass, backing vocals
Gil Moore – drums, backing vocals, percussion

Charts

References

Triumph (band) songs
1979 singles
Songs written by Rik Emmett
RCA Records singles